is a 1995 Japanese kaiju film directed by Shusuke Kaneko and written by Kazunori Itō. It is the ninth installment in the Gamera film series, serving as a reboot of the franchise, and is the first entry in the franchise's Heisei period. The film stars Tsuyoshi Ihara, Akira Onodera, Shinobu Nakayama, Ayako Fujitani, and Yukijirō Hotaru, with Naoki Manabe and Jun Suzuki portraying the giant monster Gamera, and Yuhmi Kaneyama playing Gyaos.

Gamera: Guardian of the Universe was produced by Daiei Film, Hakuhodo, and Nippon Television, and distributed by Toho Studios. The film was released theatrically in Japan on March 11, 1995, and was followed by Gamera 2: Attack of Legion in 1996.

Plot
A ship carrying plutonium collides with a floating atoll off the eastern coast of the Philippines, one of many incidents occurring throughout the area. As the anomalous formation approaches Japan, a team of scientists led by Naoya Kusanagi (Akira Onodera) discovers orihalcum amulets and a stone slab covered in Etrurian runes on the atoll. During the investigation, the atoll suddenly quakes, destroying the slab and throwing the scientists into the ocean. One member of the team, Marine Officer Yoshinari Yonemori (Tsuyoshi Ihara), sees the eye and tusk of a giant turtle.

Meanwhile, ornithologist Mayumi Nagamine (Shinobu Nakayama) investigates a village in the Goto Archipelago reportedly attacked by a "giant bird". While Nagamine is initially skeptical of the claims, she is horrified upon discovering human remains in a giant bird pellet. Exploring the nearby forest, her team encounters and then successfully prevents three bird-like creatures from attacking another village. To prevent further attacks, Nagamine agrees to aid the government in capturing the giant birds. The creatures are lured to the Fukuoka Dome baseball stadium, where two of the three are successfully captured. The last one escapes to the harbor, where it is killed by the giant turtle encountered by Yonemori and the scientists. The remaining birds escape before the turtle reaches the stadium.

After translating the runes, Kusanagi explains to Yonemori and his daughter Asagi (Ayako Fujitani) that the giant turtle is called Gamera and the birds are Gyaos. When Asagi touches one of the stone amulets, she inadvertently forms a spiritual bond with Gamera. Kusanagi also tries to convince the government that the Gyaos are the real threat, but they remain focused on Gamera due to the destruction that he caused.

Now working together to investigate the creatures, Kusanagi, Yonemori and Nagamine witness another Gyaos attack at the Kiso Mountain Range. Nagamine and Yonemori are nearly killed trying to rescue a child, but Gamera arrives in time to save them and kills another Gyaos. The last Gyaos, however, escapes. Meanwhile, Asagi discovers that she suffers the same wounds and fatigue as Gamera due to their shared bond. At Mount Fuji, she witnesses a military strike against Gamera. The attack attracts the final Gyaos to the scene, where it grievously wounds Gamera and forces the turtle to retreat into the ocean. Simultaneously, Asagi suffers a similar wound and passes out from the pain. Kusanagi visits his daughter at the hospital where Asagi falls into a coma after saying that she and Gamera must rest.

After consulting with a biologist, Nagamine and Yonemori learn that the Gyaos are genetically engineered and reproduce asexually. They speculate on the origins and purpose of Gyaos and Gamera. Nagamine suggests that Gyaos were awakened by rampant pollution and Gamera was created by an ancient civilization to combat Gyaos. They approach Kusanagi with this information, explaining that the incident at Mount Fuji shows that Asagi is spiritually linked with Gamera. Kusanagi dismisses these claims until he witnesses the amulet's power himself.

With Gamera recovering in the ocean, the last Gyaos grows unchecked, becoming a Super Gyaos. The creature attacks Tokyo, causing many civilian casualties and prompting the government to focus on Gyaos instead of Gamera. Attempts to kill Gyaos end in failure and it builds a nest in the ruins of the Tokyo Tower.

Upon awakening from her sleep, Asagi warns the others that Gamera has recovered and will attack Gyaos. Gamera catches Gyaos by surprise, destroying its nest and eggs. A massive air battle ensues and Asagi, Kusanagi, Nagamine, and Yonemori follow closely in a helicopter. Initially, Gyaos overpowers Gamera, but Asagi uses her spiritual energy to revive Gamera, who kills Gyaos. Gamera, after using his bond with Asagi to heal her, releases Asagi from their bond and returns to the sea. While Nagamine and Yonemori predict the possibility that Gyaos or other threats may arise, Asagi states that Gamera will return if that happens.

Cast
 Tsuyoshi Ihara as Yoshinari Yonemori
 Akira Onodera as Naoya Kusanagi
 Shinobu Nakayama as Mayumi Nagamine, a gifted ornithologist who is also a friend of Asagi's.
 Ayako Fujitani as Asagi Kusanagi, a young girl who forms a spiritual bond with Gamera after she received an ancient pendant found on Gamera's hide by her father.
 Yukijirō Hotaru as Inspector Osako
 Hatsunori Hasegawa as Colonel Satake
 Hirotarō Honda as Masaaki Saitō, EPA
 Naoki Manabe and Jun Suzuki as Gamera, the film's titular kaiju, Gamera is a giant flying, fireball-breathing turtle that was created by an advanced civilization to exterminate the invading Gyaos.
 Yuhmi Kaneyama as Gyaos, a species of malevolent man-eating bird creatures reawakened by environmental pollution.
 Akira Kubo as Captain of the Kairyu-maru

Production
Initially Daiei Film had intended to revive Daimajin, but opted for reviving Gamera after it was determined there was more interest in that property.

Release

Box office
Release date: March 11, 1995 (Japan)
Budget: $4,500,000
Distribution earning: ¥520,000,000 / $6,000,000 (Japan, rough figure)
Release date: April 16, 1997 (U.S., video)
Lease: $8,670 / ¥1,000,000 (from Daiei in 1997, rough figure)

Critical response 
Peter H. Gilmore of MonsterZero.us said, "All in all, this is a vibrant and energetic film. The monster battles are full of physical grappling as well as energy weapon exchanges, and the excellent suitmation is well augmented by judiciously used CGI." Popcorn Pictures said, "This is just a great, fun kaiju film. ... Gamera finally has a film to rival Godzilla (but he's still second best to the Big G, though) and rid the infamous legacy that has dogged him throughout his motion picture life." David Miller of CULT MOVIES praised the film's special effects, calling the film "one of the best of all the giant monster films". Steve Biodrowski of CINEMAFANTASIQUE praised the film's "money shot" moments, also saying "supplying the necessary 'oomph' to push this over from being merely diverting to being outright exhilarating". The New York Daily News praised the film's action sequences, stating that the "giant monster movie fans seeking a big-screen treat will find it here". Roger Ebert gave the film three stars out of four, saying that, despite its flaws, "Gamera is more fun" than "megabudget solemnity like Air Force One", and that "Gamera is not a good movie but it is a good moviegoing experience".

Accolades

References

External links

"ガメラ 大怪獣空中決戦 (Gamera: Daikaijū Kuchu Kessen) in Japanese" at the Japanese Movie Database

Daiei Film films
Toho films
1995 fantasy films
1990s science fiction films
Japanese science fiction films
Gamera films
Giant monster films
Kaiju films
1995 films
Films directed by Shusuke Kaneko
Japanese sequel films
Reboot films
Films set in Tokyo
Films set in Fukuoka
Films set in Shizuoka Prefecture
Films set in Nagano Prefecture
Films set in Nagasaki Prefecture
1990s monster movies
Films scored by Kow Otani
1990s Japanese films